Dara Rolins (born 7 December 1972) is a Slovak recording artist and entrepreneur. Her music career began at the age of nine, after being cast in the television musical Zázračný autobus (1981). The early role established a formula for her regular assignments as a child singer, and resulted in recording her debut album Keby som bola princezná Arabela (1983) on OPUS Records. By her late teens, Rolins appeared in a number of made-for-TV films of varying quality, as well as managing to deliver a series of teen pop-orientated albums, such as Darinka (1986), Čo o mne vieš (1988) and soundtrack Téměř růžový příběh (1990), all released by Supraphon. Along with Karel Gott, she experienced a one-off success in the German-speaking region in 1986, peaking with their duet "Fang das Licht" ("Catch the Light") (the German version of their Czech duet "Zvonky štěstí") at number seven on the Austrian Singles Chart, and number fifteen in Germany.

As she reached adulthood, her popularity had stalled in the nineties. However, she made an attempt to replicate her local status abroad via the English set What You See Is What You Get (1996). The work distributed through a subsidiary of BMG, however, failed to attract the international market and she returned to homebase to resume her former course. Sen lásky (1997), which served as her initial comeback release featuring cover versions of various composers of classical era, produced a ZAI Awards-nomination within Slovak outputs. Following that, she continued in publishing dance material, namely What's My Name (2002) and D1 (2005); both on Epic. Her additional recordings included the best-of compilation 1983–1998 (2005) on Bonton, remix collection D2: Remixy (2008) by Epic and live recording of christmas album Šťastné a veselé (2009), released on Universal. On TV, she rebuilt her presence in 2007 for one season as a co-judge of reality show Slovensko hľadá SuperStar, and in the 2009 series of Česko Slovenská Superstar, also based on United Kingdom Pop Idol. She later joined the cast of Let's Dance (2011) and X Factor (2014).

Besides her recording achievements, Rolins posed topless in October 1999 for the Czech and Slovak issues of a men's magazine as a Playboy cover girl. She also upgraded her physical assets such as breasts prior to undergoing plastic surgery. The national press speculated about a rhinoplasty as well. In the new millennium, she has become the subject of more scrutiny. First, there was a 2009 revelation regarding her factual surname printed by Plus 7 dní; for over thirty years since her first public performance, she referred to herself exclusively under an adopted name. The following year, Rolins was accused of a negligent homicide caused by her 10 July 2010 traffic collision. The legal case, initially dropped due to a lack of probable cause, was later re-launched. In 2011, the pop singer released a new studio album on EMI entitled Stereo (2011). Receiving mixed reviews, the work featured an explicit, almost nude cover. Most recently, she released album ETC without a label.

Biography

Early years
Dara Rolins, or Darina Rolincová, was born Darina Gambošová on 7 December 1972 in Bratislava, former Czechoslovakia. She is the younger daughter of Zlatica Rolincová (1945) and Dušan Gamboš (1948), parents of Slovak ancestry. She was raised with her half-sister Jana Labasová (1964), better identified as Jana Hádlová-Rolincová per marriage with Czech record producer Daniel Hádl. When she was four years old, Rolincová provisionally appeared in front of television cameras on the show Matelko, produced by STV. The regular program that starred a hand puppet named Drobček (Petit) was crafted for children. In 1978, encouraged by winning the talent contest Hledáme mladé talenty (Young Talents Wanted), she started to participate in local musical ensembles such as the Children's Choir of Czechoslovak Radio in Bratislava. Later on, she had piano lessons.

Discography 

Studio albums

Solo
1983: Keby som bola princezná Arabela
1986: Darinka
1988: Čo o mne vieš 
1996: What You See Is What You Get
1997: Sen lásky
2002: What's My Name
2006: D1
2011: Stereo
2017: ETC

Live Recordings
2009: Šťastné A Veselé
2021: Nablízko

With Others
1991: Snehulienka A 7 Pretekárov
1994: Thumbelina (Czech version)
1998: Sexy Dancers – Butcher's on the Road
2002: Wedding Band – Na Slovenskej Svadbe 1

Filmography 

Notes
A  Denotes a televised musical theatre.

Bibliography

Copyrights

Awards

Major awards

Notes
B  Best Album category of 1997 was won by Svet lásku má, credited to various artists such as Pavol Habera, Peter Dvorský and Karel Gott. Other nominated works included Ultrapop by Hex, Štyry by Vidiek, Made II Mate's Carousel Life and the Klik-klak album by IMT Smile.
C  Aurel Awards allowed only three nominated artists per category. As a result of the equal number of votes received from academics, Rolins was nominated in 2006 for Best Female Vocal Performance with Barbara Haščáková. The other nominees were Tina and Katarína Knechtová. Tina eventually won the award.
D  Best Music Video category in 2006 went to "Miles" by Lavagance band, directed by Branislav Špaček.

Music polls

Notes
E  In 1998, Rolins shared her top ranking (#27) as Female Singer with Marcela Holanová.
F  In 2000, Rolins was classified in Teenagers' Choice list at No. 63.
G  Within the Slovak Act category, Rolins finished at No. 10 in 2008.
H  In 2009 and 2011, she was ranked as the 9th Slovak Act.
I  In 2010, Rolins finished at No. 11 in the Slovak category.
J  Within the Žebřík 1998 pool, Rolins was also classified as the 11th in the so-called Biggest Surprise category.

Controversies

Car accident
On 8 October 2010 Rolins was officially accused by the Czech police of negligent manslaughter as the result of her traffic collision on Saturday 10 July 2010 in Prague. The singer, driving her Mercedes-Benz, had hit a motor scooter with a 63-year-old man named Jindřich Rotrekl, who died of his injuries three hours after he was escorted into hospital. She would deny all charges, however, and the case was dropped due to a lack of probable cause on 2 November 2010.

New prosecution
In August 2011, the prosecution against Rolins was re-launched following a new assessment, provided on behalf of the victim's family. According to the report, Rolins' vehicle had entered the opposite lane and hit the motorcyclist. On 19 September the singer was, therefore, re-interrogated by police officers, while facing up to six years in prison.

On 13 August 2012, the jury of the Prague Second District Court found Rolins guilty. She got a suspended sentence of two years and two months to three years probation. The singer also needed to reimburse about four million Czech crowns (approx. €160,224) in damages. In addition to court costs, the singer had to pay compensation to the family and all costs associated with the burial of the victim. She was also banned from operating a vehicle for three years. As of August 2012, the verdict, however, was not yet final and Rolins might appeal.

See also
 The 100 Greatest Slovak Albums of All Time

Notes

References

External links 

 DaraRolins.cz (official website, out of order)
DaraRolins on YouTube
 
 Darina Rolincová on Discogs
 

1972 births
21st-century Slovak women singers
Living people
Musicians from Bratislava
Slovak actresses
Slovak child singers
Slovak expatriates in the Czech Republic
20th-century Slovak women singers
Czechoslovak women singers